"A Mean Pair of Jeans" is a song by Australian pop singer-songwriter Marty Rhone. It was released in Australia in March 1977 as the second single from his second studio album, Marty Rhone. The song peaked at number ten on the Australian Kent Music Report singles chart.

Background 

Marty Rhone's breakthrough single, "Denim and Lace" (July 1975), reached No. 8 on the Australian Kent Music Report singles chart. His next top 40 hit, "On the Loose", was released in December 1976. "A Mean Pair of Jeans", which followed in March of the next year, peaked at No. 10. Both "On the Loose" and "A Mean Pair of Jeans" appeared on his second studio album, Marty Rhone, in July 1977.

Track listing

7" single (MS-209)'Side A "A Mean Pair of Jeans" - 3:29
Side B "I'm Gone Again" - 3:28

12" single (MSD-109)'
Side A "A Mean Pair of Jeans" - 6:00
Side B "They Made It Rock" - 5:30

Charts

Weekly charts

Year-end charts

References

1977 singles
1976 songs
EMI Records singles